Trona is a carbonate mineral.

Trona may also refer to:

Places 
 Trona, Inyo County, California
 Trona, San Bernardino County, California

Other uses 
Trona (gastropod), a genus of sea snails in the cowrie family